Helge Sjögren (25 December 1902 – 31 October 1959) was a Swedish weightlifter. He competed in the men's lightweight event at the 1928 Summer Olympics.

References

External links
 

1902 births
1959 deaths
Swedish male weightlifters
Olympic weightlifters of Sweden
Weightlifters at the 1928 Summer Olympics
Sportspeople from Norrköping
20th-century Swedish people